Dial 'M' for Monkey may refer to:
 Dial 'M' for Monkey (book), a 2006 book by Adam Maxwell
 Dial 'M' for Monkey (album), a 2003 album by Bonobo
 Dial M for Monkey segment, a back-up segment featured in early episodes of Dexter's Laboratory